Gilbert Agius (born 21 February 1974) is a Maltese professional football manager for Liga 1 club PSIS Semarang and former footballer who played as a forward.

Playing career
Agius was the captain of his hometown club side Valletta and is one of the most well known and highly respected figures in Maltese football history. He is hailed as a hero by the Valletta fans, due to his loyalty to his hometown club, where he played since 1990, bar a short spell during the first half of the 2001–02 season which he spent on loan to the Lega Pro Prima Divisione club Pisa. His number 7 shirt is retired in respect of his loyalty and great service to the club. He is the most capped player and the all time goal scorer at Valletta Agius is also the player who won the most honours in Valletta history. He also holds the record of top Maltese scorer in European games with 10 goals.

Gilbert Agius has received three Malta Football Association Player of the Year awards. The first was won in 1996–97, the second in Valletta's successful 2000–01 season, the third in 2006–07.

At the start of the 2007–08 season Agius was on trial with Enköpings SK, but later he opted to stay with Valletta. At the end of 2007 Agius was out with a thigh injury for several months. He returned just as the team started fulfilling its potential, and led Valletta to the first title since 2000–01. He won a single Player of the Month award during the season (September 2007) and was chosen as Best Local Player in the Maltese Football Awards at the end of the 2007–08 season.

At the beginning of the 2012–13 season Agius was named to be Assistant Manager of Valletta, with new Manager Mark Miller. He later left this role and came out of retirement to play for Gozo side Xewkija Tigers helping them to win the Gozo Football League.

Coaching career 
After his short spell with Xewkija Tigers, Agius came back to Valletta, where he took again the place of assistant manager. In such role he had the chance to replace the head coach several times. In 2019 he replaced Danilo Doncic as a caretaker manager of the citizens, and led the club to win the title after beating Hibernians in the decider match. In December 2020 Agius came back in help of his club, taking the role of caretaker coach again after the resignation of Jesmond Zerafa. At the end of the year he was replaced by Tozé Mendes, coming back to his role as assistant manager.

In January 2021 Agius was appointed as new head coach of the Malta national under-21 football team.

For the first time in his career, he coached outside the Europe continent, in 15 February 2023 Agius was appointed as new head coach of the PSIS Semarang.

Achievements

Player 
Maltese Premier League: 8
 1991/92, 1996/97, 1997/98, 1998/99, 2000/01, 2007/08, 2010/2011, 2011/12

Maltese Cup: 7 
 1994/95, 1995/96, 1996/97, 1998/99, 2000/01, 2009/10

MFA Super Cup: 7 
 1994/95 1996/97 1997/98 1998/99 2000/01 2007/08 2010/11

Löwenbräu Cup: 6 
 1993/94 1994/95 1995/96 1996/97 1997/98 2000/01

Super 5 Lottery Tournament: 4 
 1992/93 1996/97 1999/00 2000/01 2007/08

National League 100 Anniversary Cup: 1 
 2010

Centenary Cup: 1 
 2000

BetFair Cup (Exhibition Match) : 1 
 2008

Mare Blue Cup 1
 2010 2011

 Maltese Player of the Year : 3
 1996/97, 2000/01, 2006/07

Manager
Maltese Premier League: 1
 2018/19

International career

Malta
Gilbert has recorded a remarkable 120 caps for his country, making him the third most capped player in Malta's history. For the national team, he has often been used a defensive midfielder in recent years. Not due to exceptional defensive skills, but due to his ability to distribute the ball. He has scored 8 goals for the national team. At club level he has played primarily as a supporting forward. Gilbert was captain of Malta for many years until he stopped being called up for international duty, but is loved by fans and remembered to be a very passionate player who loved to play for his country.

Agius' goal in a 1–1 friendly game against Austria was voted Goal of the Season in the 2006–07 Malta Football Awards.

International goals
Malta Goals

Managerial statistics

See also
List of men's footballers with 100 or more international caps

References

External links 

 Gilbert Agius at MaltaFootball.com 
 

Living people
1974 births
Maltese footballers
Malta international footballers
Maltese Premier League players
Serie C players
Valletta F.C. players
FIFA Century Club
Maltese expatriate footballers
People from Valletta
Xewkija Tigers F.C. players
Association football midfielders
Maltese expatriate sportspeople in Italy
Expatriate footballers in Italy